Amanat is a Pakistani social drama series, produced by Amna Nawaz Khan under their production banner ANK Production while she also directed and written this serial. The drama airs weekly on Urdu 1 every Tuesday. It stars Rabab Hashim, Noor Hassan Rizvi and Sehar Afzal in lead roles.

Cast
 Rabab Hashim as Tehzeeb
 Noor Hassan Rizvi as Sarosh
 Sehar Afzal as Nisha
 Annie Zaidi as Sarosh's mother
 Hannan Sameed
 Shaheen Khan as Tehzeeb's mother
 Lubna Aslam
 Rashid Farooqui

References

2017 Pakistani television series debuts
Pakistani drama television series
Urdu 1 original programming